Alpha-(1,3)-fucosyltransferase is an enzyme that in humans is encoded by the FUT7 gene.

Function 

The sialyl Lewis x oligosaccharide determinant is an essential component of leukocyte counterreceptors for E-selectin- (MIM 131210) and P-selectin- (MIM 173610) mediated adhesions of leukocytes. This oligosaccharide molecule is displayed on the surfaces of granulocytes, monocytes, and natural killer cells. Formation of leukocyte adhesions to these selectins is an early and important step in the process that ultimately allows leukocytes to leave the vascular tree and become recruited into lymphoid tissues and sites of inflammation.[supplied by OMIM]

References

Further reading